Maria Hryhorivna Nikiforova (1885–1919) was a Ukrainian anarchist partisan leader that led the Black Guards during the Ukrainian War of Independence, becoming widely renowned as an atamansha.

A self-described terrorist from the age of 16, she was imprisoned for her activities in Russia but managed to escape to western Europe. With the outbreak of World War I, she took up the defencist line and joined the French Foreign Legion on the Macedonian front before returning to Ukraine with the outbreak of the 1917 Revolution.

In her home city of Oleksandrivsk (today Zaporizhzhia), she established an anarchist combat detachment and subsequently attacked the forces of the Russian Provisional Government and the Ukrainian People's Republic. After the October Revolution escalated into a civil war, she joined the side of the Ukrainian Soviet Republic, leading her druzhina in capturing Taurida and Yelysavethrad (today Kropyvnytskyi) from the Ukrainian People's Army.

When Ukraine was invaded by the Central Powers, she was forced to flee to Russia, where she was prosecuted for insubordination by the nascent Bolshevik government. When she returned to Ukraine, she briefly participated in the civilian activities of the Makhnovshchina but before long she had returned to terrorism. She aimed to assassinate the leaders of the White movement (Anton Denikin and Alexander Kolchak) but was caught and executed.

Biography

Early life and exile

Born in Oleksandrivsk in 1885, Maria's father had been an officer during the Russo-Turkish War of 1877–1878. At the age of 16, she left home and became a wage laborer, working first as babysitter, then as a retail clerk, and ultimately as a factory worker, washing bottles in a vodka distillery. 

Shortly after starting work, she joined a local anarcho-communist group, which had been established in the lead up to the 1905 Revolution. Following a period of political probation, Nikiforova became involved in the group's campaign of "motiveless terrorism", during which she staged a number of bombings and expropriation missions, including armed robberies.  When Nikiforova was captured, she attempted to commit suicide by blowing herself up, but the bomb failed and she was imprisoned. In 1908, her trial for murder and armed robbery resulted in Nikiforova being sentenced to capital punishment, although this was later commuted to life imprisonment with hard labor, due to her young age. She served part of her sentence in the Petropavlovsk prison in St. Petersburg before being exiled to Siberia in 1910. 

After staging a prison riot, she escaped via the Trans-Siberian Railway to Vladivostok and subsequently went on to Japan. A group of Chinese anarchists secured her passage to the United States, where she briefly stayed with other exiled Russian anarchists and published articles in their Russian language newspapers. In 1912, she joined the anarchist movement in Restoration Spain and participated in a bank robbery in Barcelona during which she was wounded and forced to clandestinely seek treatment in Paris. Herself an intersex woman, Nikiforova also reportedly underwent a medical intervention while being treated.

In the cafes of the French capital, Nikiforova met a number of exiled Russian artists and politicians, one of which was the Ukrainian Social-Democrat Vladimir Antonov-Ovseenko, and even became an artist herself, specializing in painting and sculpting. During this time, she also entered into a marriage of convenience with a Polish anarchist named Witold Brozstek, retaining her last name. Towards the end of 1913, she attended an anarchist conference in London, signing her name as "Marusya", a Slavic diminutive form of "Maria". With the outbreak of World War I, she sided with Peter Kropotkin's anti-German position, in favor of the Allied powers. She joined up with the French Foreign Legion and subsequently graduated as an officer from a military college. Nikiforova served on the Macedonian front before the outbreak of the 1917 Revolution convinced her to quit the front and return home.

Return to Oleksandrivsk
When Nikiforova arrived in Petrograd, she found the city in a situation of "dual power", with both the Provisional Government and the local soviet vying for control while the anarchists mostly acted as shock troops of anti-government unrest. Nikiforova organized and spoke at pro-anarchist rallies in Kronstadt, where she convinced thousands of sailors to participate in an uprising against the Provisional Government, although the lack of Bolshevik support ultimately led to its suppression. Nikiforova narrowly escaped the subsequent government crackdown in Petrograd and fled back to her home city of Oleksandrivsk, finally arriving in July 1917 after eight years in exile. Shortly after arrival, together with the city's 300-strong Anarchist Federation and supported by local factory workers, Nikiforova carried out the expropriation of the local distillery, donating part of the seized money to the local soviet. She soon established a 60-strong anarchist combat detachment and started accumulating armaments procured from attacks on police stations and warehouses, with which she hunted down and executed many of the city's army officers and landlords.

On 29 August 1917, she met with the peasant leader Nestor Makhno in the anarchist-controlled town of Huliaipole, where she gave a speech advocating for an insurrection against the rule of the newly-established Central Council of Ukraine, warning of a potential counter-revolution. Partway through Nikiforova's speech, the anarchists received news from Petrograd of an attempted coup by Lavr Kornilov and resolved to form a Committee for the Defence of the Revolution (CDR). The CDR began making plans to seize weapons from the local bourgeoisie but Nikiforova countered with a plan of her own: to raid the nearby garrison at Orikhiv. By 10 September, she had pulled together 200 fighters, armed only with only a few dozen weapons, and set out for Orikhiv by train. Upon arrival, the anarchist detachment surrounded and captured the Russian Army regiments. Nikiforova ordered the execution of all officers and disarmed the rank-and-file soldiers before letting them return to their homes. She delivered the captured weapons back to the CDR in Huliaipole, then returned to Oleksandrivsk herself.

Huliaipole subsequently began to receive threats from the local organ of the Provisional Government in Oleksandrivsk, which was disturbed by the rising anarchist influence in the region. Makhno responded by traveling to the city with Nikiforova as a guide and speaking directly to the local workers' organizations. After Makhno left the city, the authorities swiftly arrested and imprisoned Nikiforova. News of her arrest quickly spread; a delegation of workers demanded her release the next day. After being rebuffed by the Provisional Government, the workers forcibly brought the leader of the soviet to the prison and secured her release, following which Nikiforova gave a speech to the crowd, calling for anarchy. Anarchists from Huliaipole, who had been dispatched to attack Oleksandrivsk and force Nikiforova's release, celebrated upon hearing that their work had already been carried out.

During the subsequent election to the Oleksandrivsk soviet, the composition of the new body was distinctly more left-wing and included a number of anarchist delegates.

Battle for Oleksandrivsk

Maria Nikiforova welcomed the outbreak of the October Revolution as another step towards the "withering away of the state". She set about establishing armed detachments known as the "Black Guards" in Oleksandrivsk, preparing an organized anarchist response for a conflict that was rapidly escalating into civil war. In November 1917, the Oleksandrivsk Soviet voted 147 to 95 in favor of joining the Ukrainian People's Republic and refused to recognize the authority of the newly-proclaimed Russian Soviet Republic. Nikiforova responded by allying with the local revolutionary socialists, securing a clandestine shipment of weaponry and the support of the local detachment of the Black Sea Fleet. On 12 December, they launched their uprising, managing to overthrow the Soviet and reconstitute it with delegates from the Bolsheviks, Left SRs and anarchists.

On 25 December, Nikiforova and her detachment went to Kharkiv, where they collaborated in the establishment of the Ukrainian People's Republic of Soviets while also expropriating goods from the local shops and redistributing them to the population. A few days later, she led Black Guards into battle against the haydamaks at Katerynoslav, capturing the city for the Soviets and personally disarming 48 soldiers. Civil war became an inevitability following the dissolution of the Russian Constituent Assembly by the All-Russian Central Executive Committee, as the Bolsheviks began to look towards the anarchists around Nikiforova as a necessary base of support in Ukraine. While she had been away, her home city of Oleksandrivsk had fallen again under the control of the Central Council of Ukraine after three days of fighting, forcing the local anarchist detachments to withdraw. On 2 January 1918, the city was again recaptured after the arrival of Red Guards from Russia and Black Guards from Huliaipole, forcing the haydamaks in turn to retreat to right-bank Ukraine. Two days later, a revolutionary committee (Revkom) was constituted as the center of soviet power in Oleksandrivsk. Nikiforova was elected as its deputy leader.

Although the haymadaks had fled, Cossacks were beginning to return from the external front in order to join up with Alexey Kaledin's Army, and Oleksandrivsk was in the path towards their home regions of the Don and Kuban. With the Black Guards scrambling to rally their defenses, a failed assault by the first wave of Cossacks ended in their disarmament by the Revkom. While the disarmament took place, the city politicians' speeches, attempting to rally the Cossacks to the cause of socialism, were largely ignored and even mocked. But when Nikiforova spoke, calling on the "butchers of the Russian workers" to renounce the old ways of Tsarism, many of the Cossacks began to display humility; some openly wept and others maintained contact with the local anarchists. When the Cossacks departed, Makhno and Nikiforova returned to their duties in the Revkom. But after a dispute between the two regarding the sentencing of the prosecutor that had overseen Makhno's own imprisonment, Makhno decided to renounce his position and return to Huliaipole, leaving Nikiforova in place as the sole commander of Oleksandrivsk's Black Guards.

The Free Combat Druzhina

In a joint operation together with the Huliaipole anarchists, Nikiforova launched another raid against the garrison in Orikhiv, seizing a cache of arms and sending them on to Huliaipole, rather than handing them over to her nominal commander Semyon Bogdanov.

Reinforced by extra troops, the Druzhina was supplied with artillery cannons, armored cars, tachankas, warhorses and even an armored train, which they decorated with a number of anarchist flags, leaving them better-equipped than even the units of the Red Guards. The militants of the Druzhina also largely rejected uniform, in favor of their own individual senses of fashion. While the core of the group was personally loyal to Nikiforova, including a number of experienced veterans of the Black Sea Fleet, the larger section around them participated in the unit on a more ephemeral basis. 

Travelling in echelon formations, which the Left SR politician Isaac Steinberg compared to the mythical Flying Dutchman, the Druzhina advanced against the forces of the White movement and the Ukrainian nationalists. The Druzhina pushed as far as Crimea, where they captured Yalta, sacked Livadia Palace and liberated anarchist political prisoners in Sevastopol. Having participated in the establishment of the Taurida Soviet Socialist Republic, Nikiforova was elected to head the Peasant Soviet in Feodosia and used her new position to establish more detachments of the Black Guards.

Battle for Yelysavethrad
The Druzhina then moved on to the central Ukrainian city of Yelysavethrad, bloodlessly capturing the city from the Ukrainian nationalists and establishing a revolutionary committee to oversee its transition to Soviet power. While occupying the city, she assassinated a Russian officer, expropriated local stores and redistributed basic necessities to the population, and established a barter economy for non-essential goods, all in open defiance the Bolshevik-controlled Revkom. Nikiforova accused the Revkom of being too tolerant towards the bourgeoisie and having constituted a new ruling class, even threatening to disperse the organ and shoot its chairman, due to her opposition to all forms of government. The Revkom responded by ordering her to leave the city, which she did a few days later, but only after looting the city's military college of all their weapons, leaving behind a newly-established local detachment of Black Guards.

The Central Council of Ukraine responded to the rapid Soviet advance by signing a treaty with the Central Powers. With the support of the Ukrainian haydamaks, the Austro-Hungarian Army and Imperial German Army launched an invasion of Ukraine, pushing the Soviet lines back again. When the German forces arrived at Yelysavethrad, the Revkom immediately evacuated, leaving a power vacuum in the city. While the occupying powers attempted to recruit men to its side, even conscripting the local peasantry into service, the Druzhina returned to occupy Yelysavethrad, taking over the local railway station and regularly touring the city to expropriate money from the bourgeoisie. After days of tense peace between the city's official government and the anarchists, a conflict broke out between the anarchists and local factory workers, giving the government forces an opportunity to move against the Druzhina. Although the anarchists managed to defend themselves against the assault, they were far outnumbered, forcing them to withdraw to Kanatovo, where they discovered that a number of their soldiers had been taken prisoner.

Red Guards led by  attempted to retake the city, but they were surrounded and wiped out within hours of arrival, prompting the city authorities to beginning executing their prisoners of war. Nikiforova subsequently led the Druzhina in an assault by rail, digging in at the suburbs, where they were met by thousands of well-armed troops, who began spreading rumours to the local population that depicted Nikiforova as a sacrilegious bandit leader. The battle descended into a war of attrition, with constant artillery and machine gun fire exchanged between the trenches over the course of two days. Under heavy bombardment, the Druzhina fell back to Znamianka, where they were reinforced by more Red Guards under the command of Mikhail Muravyov, fresh from their victory in the Battle of Kyiv. Although the city's authorities had requested reinforcements from the Central Powers, none arrived, leaving the city vulnerable to a Soviet assault. While the Ukrainian nationalists held off Nikiforova's advance from the north,  led an assault against the largely undefended south, forcing the city to capitulate. The city's authorities complied with the Soviet demands and released Nikiforova's imprisoned soldiers, with the city ultimately remaining in Soviet hands until 19 March, when an Imperial German assault forced the Soviet forces to evacuate.

Retreat
The forces of the Ukrainian Soviet Republic were ultimately unable to withstand the combined assault of the Central Powers, with only sporadic resistance delaying the offensive. After leaving Yelysavethrad, the Druzhina stooped in Berezivka, where they came into conflict with another anarchist detachment led by Grigory Kotovsky, after Nikiforova had attempted to extort money from the town's inhabitants.  The Druzhina subsequently abandoned their train and reformed as a cavalry detachment, arranging their horses by fur colour, with Nikiforova herself riding at the head on a white horse. 

Nikiforova immediately set about seizing the estate's goods and redistributing them to the local population, to the annoyance of Matveyev, who she was still formally subordinated to. Matveyev resolved to disarm the Druzhina before any more anarchists arrived at the rendezvous. He called a general meeting in which the principles of unity and discipline were to be discussed, but when Bolsheviks started making complaints about the anarchists, Nikiforova immediately understood the true purpose of the meeting and signalled her partisans to leave, escaping the village on horseback before they could be disarmed. 

The Druzhina subsequently moved towards Oleksandrivsk, hoping to defend it from the Central Powers, but upon arrival found the city's Red Guards were already organizing their retreat. On 13 April, the Ukrainian Sich Riflemen were able to capture the city, finding the dead body of a woman that they  mistakenly believed to be Nikiforova. On 18 April, they were followed by the Imperial German Army, which forced out the remaining Soviet forces, with the Druzhina being one of the last Soviet detachments to leave. They subsequently linked up with Nestor Makhno's forces in Tsarekostyantynivka, where they found out that Huliaipole had also fallen to the Ukrainian nationalists. Nikiforova proposed a mission to rescue captured members of the town's revolutionary committee, but after a number of Red commanders refused to join and news came in of the continued German advance, she abandoned the plan and continued to retreat east.

Trials
Following the Soviet defeat in Ukraine, the Bolsheviks no longer saw the use in their anarchist allies and repressions against the Russian anarchist movement began to be carried out by the Cheka. Upon Nikiforova's arrival in Taganrog, she was immediately arrested on charges of looting and desertion, while the Druzhina was finally disarmed, in an operation overseen by the Ukrainian Bolshevik leader Volodymyr Zatonsky. The local anarchists and Left SRs demanded an explanation for Nikiforova's arrest, with Vladimir Antonov-Ovseenko himself sending a telegram in support of the anarchists, while further arrivals of Ukrainian anarchists to the city began to make the situation untenable. In April 1918, a revolutionary tribunal was held by the Ukrainian Bolsheviks. With witnesses both for the prosecution and the defense in attendance, Nikiforova was confident that revolutionary justice would be upheld and she was ultimately acquitted on all charges. 

The anarchists in Taganrog subsequently held a conference about the situation in Ukraine, during which Makhno and the Huliaipole anarchists decided they would return to southern Ukraine and carry out a campaign of guerrilla warfare against the Central Powers. Other anarchists joined Nikiforova's Druzhina, but the continued German offensive forced them to retreat to Rostov-on-Don, where they looted the local banks and burned all the bonds, deeds and loan agreements they found in a public bonfire. Here too, Nikiforova noticed that the Bolsheviks were closing in on them and decided to take the Druzhina north towards Voronezh, and over the following months they moved between a number of towns along the Ukrainian border. After the defeat of the Central Powers forced them to withdraw from Ukraine, the Ukrainian State was overthrown by the Directorate of Ukraine under Symon Petliura, making room for the Druzhina to finally return to the country in late 1918. In the subsequent power struggle, the Druzhina managed to seize Odesa from the White movement, demolishing the prison before an armed intervention by the Allied Powers forced them to quit the city.

The Druzhina then moved on to Saratov, where it was again disarmed and Nikiforova herself was again arrested. But the Cheka were reluctant to execute her without trial and had her transferred to Moscow, where she was briefly held in Butyrka prison. She was released on bail, posted by Apollon Karelin and Vladimir Antonov-Ovseenko, and she was reunited with her husband, who had taken a job in the new Soviet government. After a spell of working for the artistic institution Proletkult, Nikiforova's trial by revolutionary tribunal began on 21 January 1919. She was presented with the same charges that the Taganrog tribunal had already acquitted her of, with Georgy Pyatakov accusing her again of looting and desertion. On 25 January, Pravda announced that she had been found guilty of insubordination, although she had again been acquitted on the charges of looting, and that her punishment was a ban on holding any public office for six months.

Activities in Huliaipole
Almost immediately following the trial, Nikiforova set out for Huliaipole, now the center of an autonomous anarchist republic known as the Makhnovshchina, as part of an agreement between Nestor Makhno's Revolutionary Insurgent Army and the Ukrainian Bolsheviks. Upon her arrival, Makhno had Nikiforova put in charge of the anarchists' hospitals, nurseries and schools, forbidding her from participating in military activities due to the terms of her sentence. Nikiforova's anti-Bolshevik attitude became an immediate problem for the Makhnovists, who were more focused on fighting the White movement, with Makhno himself physically removing her from a stage after she publicly denounced the Bolsheviks during a Regional Congress. When she briefly returned to Oleksandrivsk, any anarchists she met or stayed with were promptly arrested by the Cheka. 

During the spring of 1919, Huliaipole was visited several times by a series of high-ranking Bolsheviks, during which Nikiforova acted as a hostess. Antonov-Ovseenko recalled meeting his "old acquaintance" on 28 April, while reviewing Makhno's troops and the city of Huliaipole. Seeking to clarify rumors of corruption and counter-revolutionary activity among Makhno's ranks and the soviet of the city, Antonov-Ovseenko wrote glowingly of his impression of Huliaipole. But Antonov-Ovseenko's attempts to lobby for military support for the anarchists faltered and his political power declined. Within weeks of his visit, he was replaced as commander-in-chief by Jukums Vācietis.

Nevertheless, Antonov-Ovseenko's reports quickly attracted Lev Kamenev to himself visit Huliaipole the very next week. Nikiforova met Kamenev and his entourage at the train station, and offered to escort them into the city. After meeting Makhno and touring the city, Kamenev was impressed with Nikiforova, and upon returning to Katerynoslav, he telegraphed Moscow officials with an order that her sentence be reduced to half of its original term.

Capture and death
Following news of the reduction of her sentence, Nikiforova moved to Berdiansk and began work on establishing a new detachment of Black Guards, bringing together a number of former Makhnovists and anarchist refugees, including her husband Witold Brzostek. But by June 1919, the Makhnovshchina had been outlawed by the Ukrainian Socialist Soviet Republic and the Red Army had launched an offensive against the Makhnovist rear, forcing the Ukrainian anarchists to regroup. While Makhno moved towards consolidating his military force, Nikiforova returned to her old ways, deciding to carry out a campaign of terrorism against all enemies of the Ukrainian anarchists. When the pair reunited at Tokmak, Nikiforova asked Makhno for money to fund her terrorist campaign. The meeting quickly devolved into a Mexican standoff as the two drew guns on each other, but Makhno ultimately decided to give her some of the insurgent army's funds.

Nikiforova subsequently split up her detachment into three and dispatched them to different fronts. She sent one group to Siberia, where they were ordered to assassinate Alexander Kolchak, the Supreme Ruler of the Russian State, but they were ultimately unable to locate him and instead decided to join the anti-White partisans. The other group went to Kharkiv, where they were ordered to free anarchist political prisoners and blow up the headquarters of the Cheka, but by the time they arrived the city had been evacuated and the prisoners had been shot. They decided to move on to Moscow, where they carried out a series of armed robberies to fund their planned operation to assassinate the Bolshevik Party leadership. On 25 September 1919, they managed to kill 12 and wound 55 other leading Bolsheviks in a bomb attack on a party meeting. The group was eventually wiped out during shoot outs with the Cheka, with the last remaining members blowing themselves up after being surrounded in a dacha. 

Nikiforova and Brzostek themselves led the third group to Crimea, the headquarters of South Russia, where they planned to assassinate the White commander-in-chief Anton Denikin. However, on 11 August, the couple were recognized in Sevastopol and arrested, forcing the rest of the group to quit Crimea and flee to the Kuban People's Republic, where they joined the region's anti-White partisans. Nikiforova was charged with having executed counter-revolutionaries, including White officers and the bourgeoisie, while Brzostek was charged simply with having been her husband during these events. Throughout the trial, Nikiforova displayed persistent contempt of court, swearing at the tribunal as her sentence was read. The couple were both found guilty and sentenced to execution by firing squad, with Nikiforova finally breaking down into tears as she said goodbye to her husband, before they were both shot.

On 20 September, the Oleksandrivsk Telegraph reported on Nikiforova's death, celebrating it as a victory for the White movement. Only two weeks later, the city was recaptured by the Makhnovshchina, definitively ending the White movement's control over southern Ukraine.

Political positions

Anarchism and revolution
In her youth, Nikiforova entered anarcho-communist politics and adopted militant tactics to pursue them. Throughout her years of activism, Nikiforova gave numerous speeches espousing her political opinions. However, transcriptions and quotes from her speeches scarcely survived the Soviet era, and she was not known to write her views in letters, essays, or articles. What is known of her speeches is that she was widely regarded for her charismatic oratory, which she used to expound anarchist views. Widely known as an anarchist, she was said to constantly wear entirely black clothing as a symbol of her libertarian philosophy.

During times of revolution, she favored immediate and complete redistribution of property owned by wealthy land owners, declaring, "The workers and peasants must, as quickly as possible, seize everything that was created by them over many centuries and use it for their own interests."

However, while she constantly spoke in favor of anarchist philosophy, she warned against vanguardism and elitism, insisting that anarchists could not guarantee positive social change. "The anarchists are not promising anything to anyone." She cautioned, "The anarchists only want people to be conscious of their own situation and seize freedom for themselves."

Conflicts with Soviet authority
Upon returning to Russia in 1917, Nikiforova was influenced by Apollon Karelin, a veteran anarchist who advocated a tactical strategy of "Soviet anarchism." Meeting her in Petrograd, Karelin's political tactics encouraged anarchist participation in Soviet institutions with the long term plan of directing them towards an anarchist agenda, provided these institutions did not deviate from revolutionary goals. In the event that they deviated from a radical agenda, anarchists were to rebel against them. Such institutional cooperation was widely disliked among anarchists, as they were largely a minority within such institutions, rendering their activity ineffectual.

Nikiforova agreed to ally with the Bolsheviks under special circumstances and negotiated to have herself appointed to a soviet institution, briefly becoming the Deputy leader of the Oleksandrivsk revkom. She would go on to help establish footholds for Soviet power in several Ukrainian cities, demanding material support from Bolshevik agents in return, which she then used to pursue her anarchist agenda. Although she would ally herself with the Red Army on multiple occasions, she was constantly at odds with their commanders and personally antagonized several, arguing against some their practices on revolutionary grounds. Upon discovering that a Soviet commander was hoarding luxury goods looted from an aristocrat's home, she angrily confronted him for his selfishness. "The property of the estate owners doesn't belong to any particular detachment," she declared "but to the people as a whole. Let the people take what they want."

Legacy

Postmortem mythology
Rumours about her alleged survival persisted after Nikiforova's death and her legacy created an opportunity for copycats, with three women fighters adopting the name of "Marusya" as a pseudonym throughout the remainder of the Ukrainian War of Independence. In 1919, a 25-year-old Ukrainian nationalist school teacher adopted the name Marusya Sokolovskaia and took command her late brother's cavalry detachment, before she was captured by the Reds and shot. In 1920-1921, Marusya Chernaya was also commander of a cavalry regiment in the Revolutionary Insurgent Army of Ukraine, before dying in battle against the Red Army. During the Tambov Rebellion in Russia, one of the rebel commanders was a woman named Marusya Kosova, who disappeared after the suppression of the revolt.

In the years following her death, Nikiforova was also rumoured to have become a Soviet spy in Paris, where she was alleged to have been involved in the assassination of the Ukrainian nationalist leader Symon Petliura. Although the actual identity of the assassin was the Ukrainian Jewish anarchist Sholom Schwartzbard.

Historiography
Nikiforova's illicit activities meant that she left very few records during her life, only emerging as a public figure during her final years as a military commander. Available accounts of her life have either come from her military service record or from the memoirs of her contemporaries, such as Nestor Makhno and Viktor Bilash. 

Nikiforova's biography was largely neglected by Soviet historiography, which focused its women's history largely on female Bolsheviks, only ever referencing Nikiforova briefly and using negative depictions. She has likewise been largely neglected in Ukrainian historiography, as her staunch anti-nationalist positions directly contradicted the historical narratives of Ukrainian nationalism, as well as anarchist historiography, which has focused most of its attention on Nestor Makhno. Nevertheless, following the dissolution of the Soviet Union, there has been a renewed interest in Nikiforova, with several essays and a biography about her life being published during the 21st century.

See also

Lists
List of guerrillas
List of military commanders
List of Ukrainians

References

Bibliography

External links

1885 births
1919 deaths
20th-century executions by Russia
20th-century Ukrainian women politicians
Anarchist partisans
Anarcho-communists
Anti-nationalism in Europe
Executed anarchists
Executed Ukrainian women
Female revolutionaries
French military personnel of World War I
Intersex military personnel
Intersex politicians
Intersex women
Makhnovshchina
People convicted on terrorism charges
People executed by Russia by firing squad
Politicians  from Zaporizhzhia
People of the Russian Revolution
People of the Russian Civil War
Soviet people of the Ukrainian–Soviet War
Ukrainian anarchists
Ukrainian guerrillas
Ukrainian rebels
Ukrainian revolutionaries
Ukrainian women in World War I
Women in European warfare
Women in war 1900–1945
Military personnel from Zaporizhzhia